The Borneo International Marathon is a marathon held in Kota Kinabalu, Sabah, East Malaysia. The inaugural race was held on 12 October 2008. This is the first marathon in the state for over 20 years.

The Borneo International Marathon was started by four friends and runners: Andrew Voon, Christopher Nielsen, Urs Weisskop and Simon Amos.

The heat that runners face in Borneo is the biggest challenge in this event and water stations are critical to ensuring that runners avoid collapse. Volunteers provide drinks, energy foods and marshalling along the route and watch for runners who may be suffering from the effects of the heat.

After 2 years the directors team began to shrink. Urs and Christopher left Sabah for work and Simon eventually became unable to dedicate the time and money to make the event happen. Andrew Voon continued until he died in June 2011 while running at his local park.

The 2020 edition of the race was cancelled due to the coronavirus pandemic, with all registrants receiving refunds minus a 7% administration fee.

Route 
The original route took runners past the University of Malaysia Sabah and 1Borneo Hypermall on the first leg of the full marathon then back past Jalan Istiadat and through the city out to Tanjung Aru before turning round to return to the sports stadium. The new route enters the university campus and introduces some tricky hills to the hill-averse distance runners making the marathon one of the toughest in Asia.

Winners 
This list of winners below only applies to Full Marathon (42 km) only.
Key:

References

External links 
 Borneo International Marathon Official Website

Marathons in Malaysia
Recurring sporting events established in 2008
2008 establishments in Malaysia
Sport in Sabah